The 45th Texas Legislature met from January 12, 1937, to May 22, 1937, and in two special sessions, both in 1937, each lasting 30 days.

Sessions

Regular Session: January 12, 1937 – May 22, 1937
1st Called Session: May 27, 1937 – June 25, 1937
2nd Called Session: September 27, 1937 – October 26, 1937

Party summary

Senate

House

Officers

Senate
 Lieutenant Governor: Walter Frank Woodul (D)
 Presidents Pro Tempore: Regular Session	Will D. Pace (D) 1st Called Session – Olan R. Van Zandt (D) 2nd Called Session – Allan Shivers (D)

House
 Speaker of the House: Robert Wilburn Calvert (D)

Members

Senate

Dist. 1
 E. Harold Beck (D), Texarkana

Dist. 2
 Joe Hill (D), Henderson

Dist. 3
 John S. Redditt (D), Lufkin

Dist. 4
 Allan Shivers (D), Port Arthur

Dist. 5
 Gordon Burns (D), Huntsville

Dist. 6
 Clay Cotten (D), Palestine

Dist. 7
 Will D. Pace (D), Tyler

Dist. 8
 A. M. Aiken, Jr. (D), Paris

Dist. 9
 Olin Van Zandt (D), Tioga

Dist. 10
 Claude Isbell (D), Rockwall

Dist. 11
 Claud Westerfield (D), Dallas

Dist. 12
 Vernon Lemmons (D), Waxahachie

Dist. 13
 Doss Hardin (D), Waco

Dist. 14
 Albert Stone (D), Brenham

Dist. 15
 Louis Sulak (D), La Grange

Dist. 16
 Weaver Moore (D), Houston

Dist. 17
 T. J. Holbrook (D), Galveston

Dist. 18
 Morris Roberts (D), Pettus

Dist. 19
 Rudolph A. Weinert (D), Seguin

Dist. 20
 Houghton Brownlee (D), Austin

Dist. 21
 James Manley Head (D), Stephenville

Dist. 22
 H. Grady Woodruff (D), Decatur

Dist. 23
 Ben Oneal (D), Wichita Falls

Dist. 24
 Wilbourne Collie (D), Eastland

Dist. 25
 Ephraim Davis (D), Brownwood

Dist. 26
 J. Franklin Spears (D), San Antonio

Dist. 27
 Jim Neal (D), Mirando City

Dist. 28
 Frank H. Rawlings (D), Fort Worth

Dist. 29
 Henry L. Winfield (D), Fort Stockton

Dist. 30
 G. Hobert Nelson (D), Lubbock

Dist. 31
 C.C. Small (D), Amarillo

House
The House was composed of 150 Democrats.

House members included future Governor Coke R. Stevenson and future State Treasurer Jesse James.

Sources
Legislative Reference Library of Texas

External links

45th Texas Legislature
1937 in Texas
1937 U.S. legislative sessions